Ab Chur (also Romanized as Āb Chūr and Ābchowr; also known as Āpkhvor) is a village in Aladagh Rural District, in the Central District of Bojnord County, North Khorasan Province, Iran. At the 2006 census, its population was 437, in 106 families.

References 

Populated places in Bojnord County